Mikhail Aleksandrovich Kukushkin (born 26 December 1987) is a Russian-born Kazakhstani professional tennis player. Before 2008, he played for his country of birth, Russia.

Career

Born in Volgograd, Russian SFSR, Soviet Union, he turned pro in 2006.

In 2009, he came through qualifying to reach the main draw of a Masters Series 1000 tournament for the first time at the Miami Masters. He beat Tommy Haas in the first round, but lost to Dmitry Tursunov in the second round.

In September 2010, during the Davis Cup play-offs, he notably beat Swiss player Stanislas Wawrinka. His good form continued, later winning his only ATP World Tour title, as he beat world number 10 player Mikhail Youzhny in the final of the St. Petersburg Open 6–3, 7–6.

In January 2012, Kukushkin became the first player with a Kazakh passport to reach the fourth round of the 2012 Australian Open, after defeating Guillermo García-López, Viktor Troicki and Gaël Monfils. Later that season, he reached a then career-high singles ranking of World No. 49, just after the quarterfinals at Nice and the second round at the 2012 French Open.  At the 2012 Olympics, he lost in the first round of the men's singles to Gilles Simon.
By the end of 2012 he suffered from a bad hip injury and had to go for surgery twice. By August 2013 his ranking had tumbled to No. 430. After making his recovery he reached the third round of the 2013 US Open, his best performance in the American Grand Slam, starting from the qualifying draw. In September he found good form again, winning two Challenger Tournaments in Turkey: Izmir and Istanbul. He then reached his second ATP World Tour final in Moscow, at the Kremlin Cup, beating in the semifinals World No. 22 and defending champion Andreas Seppi.

In the 2014 Wimbledon Championships, he reached the third round where he lost in four sets to world No. 1 Rafael Nadal 7–6(7–4), 1–6, 1–6, 1–6. As a result of his run he reached a new career high of No. 48 in July 2014. At the 2014 Kremlin Cup he defeated Fabio Fognini and Mikhail Youzhny to reach the semifinals, where he lost to Marin Čilić.  At the 2014 Swiss Indoors, he won over world No. 4 Stanislas Wawrinka in the first round. At the 2014 Shanghai Rolex Masters he defeated Kevin Anderson to reach the third round, where he fell to world No. 1 Novak Djokovic in three sets.
At the 2015 US Open, Kukushkin defeated 17th seed Grigor Dimitrov 6–3, 7–6(7–2), 2–6, 4–6, 6–4 to reach the third round.

In August 2022, Mikhail Kukushkin won his first match at the Challenger in Chicago as an alternate where he defeated the American Govind Nanda. In November, he reached the Challenger final in Andria where he lost to Leandro Riedi.
He finished the year 2022 ranked No. 223 on 21 November 2022, his lowest ranking in 15 years.

Performance timelines

Singles
Current through the 2022 Miami Open.

Doubles

ATP career finals

Singles: 4 (1 title, 3 runners-up)

Challenger and Futures finals

Singles: 26 (15 titles, 11 runner–ups)

Doubles: 3 (1 title, 2 runner–ups)

Record against other players

Record against top 10 players

Kukushkin's match record against those who have been ranked in the top 10, with those who have been No. 1 in bold (ATP World Tour, Grand Slam and Davis Cup main draw matches).

  Fabio Fognini 3–2
  Andrey Rublev 3–2
  Mikhail Youzhny 3–2
  Grigor Dimitrov 2–1
  Stan Wawrinka 2–3
  David Ferrer 2–7
  Ernests Gulbis 1–0
  Denis Shapovalov 1–0
  James Blake 1–1
  Juan Martín del Potro 1–1
  Tommy Haas 1–1
  Karen Khachanov 1–1
  Tommy Robredo 1–1
  Janko Tipsarević 1–1
  Gaël Monfils 1–2
  Diego Schwartzman 1–2
  Roberto Bautista Agut 1–3
  Marin Čilić 1–3
  Kevin Anderson 1–4
  John Isner 1–4
  Matteo Berrettini 0–1
  Arnaud Clément 0–1
  Nikolay Davydenko 0–1
  Ivan Ljubičić 0–1
  Juan Mónaco 0–1
  Milos Raonic 0–1
  Dominic Thiem 0–1
  Alexander Zverev 0–1
  Tomáš Berdych 0–2
  Pablo Carreño Busta 0–2
  Novak Djokovic 0–2
  Juan Carlos Ferrero 0–2
  David Goffin 0–2
  Daniil Medvedev 0–2
  Radek Štěpánek 0–2
  Roger Federer 0–3
  Richard Gasquet 0–3
  Lucas Pouille 0–3
  Stefanos Tsitsipas 0–3
  Andy Murray 0–4
  Rafael Nadal 0–4
  Gilles Simon 0–4
  Kei Nishikori 0–10

*

Top 10 wins
He has a  record against players who were, at the time the match was played, ranked in the top 10.

References

External links
 
 
 
 
 

1987 births
Living people
Sportspeople from Volgograd
Russian male tennis players
Kazakhstani male tennis players
Naturalised citizens of Kazakhstan
Naturalised tennis players
Russian emigrants to Kazakhstan
Tennis players at the 2012 Summer Olympics
Olympic tennis players of Kazakhstan
Tennis players at the 2014 Asian Games
Asian Games medalists in tennis
Asian Games gold medalists for Kazakhstan
Medalists at the 2014 Asian Games
Tennis players at the 2020 Summer Olympics